Garibaldi's Lovers (also known as The Commander and the Stork) is a 2012 Italian comedy film directed by Silvio Soldini.

Cast 

 Valerio Mastandrea: Leo
 Alba Rohrwacher: Diana
 Claudia Gerini: Teresa
 Luca Zingaretti: Avvocato Malaffano
 Giuseppe Battiston: Amanzio
 Giuseppe Cederna: Direttore supermarket

References

External links

2012 films
Italian comedy films
Films directed by Silvio Soldini
2012 comedy films
2010s Italian films